A hydrospring or hydro-spring is a spring damped by hydraulic fluid (typically oil) being driven through holes in a piston, as the piston moves in response to a force. The spring is often made of rubber. Inside a rubber hydrospring there are hydraulic viscous damping systems which damp movement in all three directions but require very few parts. Even the slack adjustment may be integrated into the element.

Hydrosprings are used mainly as shock absorbers in applications such as damped suspension in railway bogies, bulldozer blade shock absorbers and as recoil absorbers for artillery.

See also
 Dashpot

References

 Army Dictionary - see hydrospring
 Army Dictionary - see recoil cylinder
 A railway hydrospring

Springs (mechanical)